Hermann Lingnau (born 22 October 1936 in Kassel) is a German former shot putter who competed in the 1960 Summer Olympics.

References

German male shot putters
Olympic athletes of the United Team of Germany
Athletes (track and field) at the 1960 Summer Olympics
Universiade medalists in athletics (track and field)
Universiade gold medalists for West Germany
Sportspeople from Kassel
People from Hesse-Nassau
1936 births
Living people
Medalists at the 1959 Summer Universiade